United States Army in World War II is the official history of the ground forces of the United States Army during World War II.  The 78-volume work was originally published beginning in 1946.

Overview 
The work describes and to a degree evaluates the ground operations of the Army in 21 volumes.  Additional volumes address grand strategy; recruitment, organization, and training; the service forces; the technical services; and special studies; again almost exclusively those of the ground forces.  Three additional volumes provide a pictorial account.  (Air operations, logistics, and training are presented in a separate seven-volume series, The Army Air Forces in World War II.)  Different authors or teams wrote most of the accounts, though some authors wrote more than one.  Most of the authors were serving or retired officers though enlisted personnel and professional historians also contributed.

The volumes devoted to operations are grouped by theater and campaign. (See the list of titles below.)  Battles are described at a unit level appropriate to the size of the engagement.  In some cases authors detail the actions of units as small as an infantry company, though most battles are presented at the battalion or regimental level.  Many accounts of individual heroism are included, especially actions which resulted in the award of the Medal of Honor.

Each volume includes some photographs.  Operations volumes include small maps within the text and larger fold-out maps attached inside the back cover.  All operations volumes include bibliographical notes, a glossary, a list of code names, and a list of military map symbols.  Some include additional features such as a table of equivalent U.S. and German, Italian, or Japanese ranks.

More than two-thirds of the volumes of the history are devoted to subjects other than actual operations.  (See the list of titles below.)  These provide information which is not appropriate for a purely operational history but is important for an understanding of the Army's activities as a whole during the war.

Contents
THE WAR DEPARTMENT

THE ARMY GROUND FORCES

THE ARMY SERVICE FORCES

THE WESTERN HEMISPHERE

THE WAR IN THE PACIFIC

THE MEDITERRANEAN THEATER OF OPERATIONS

THE EUROPEAN THEATER OF OPERATIONS

THE MIDDLE EAST THEATER

THE CHINA-BURMA-INDIA THEATER

THE TECHNICAL SERVICES

SPECIAL STUDIES

PICTORIAL RECORD

Publication history
The works were first published by the Historical Division, Department of the Army, from March 28, 1950 called the Office of the Chief of Military History and from June 15, 1973, the Center of Military History.  They are in a large format, 7¼” x 10”, with green cloth covers and no dust jackets.  The cover has only the eagle insignia of the Army; the title, author, and other data are on the spine.  Many volumes have been reprinted by the Center of Military History in the same format beginning in the 1980s, and most are available as PDF downloads.

The operations-oriented volumes and some others were reprinted by The National Historical Society during the 1990s in a 50th Anniversary Commemorative Edition series.  They are 7” x 9” with a hard cover (without a dust jacket) whose face is a black-and-white photograph with the title superimposed.  They omitted the original editions’ fold-out maps but instead printed them in two separate atlases.

Two volumes, ‘’Cross Channel Attack’’ and ‘’The Ardennes: Battle of the Bulge’’, were reprinted in the 1990s by Konecky & Konecky in a large 8½” by 11” format.  They, too, omitted the fold-out maps.  Other publishing houses have also reprinted selected volumes.

References

External links
 Scanned images of many volumes
 Synopses and ratings at goodreads.com

 
Series of history books about World War II
Official military history books
Book series introduced in 1946
Non-fiction books about the United States Army